Midhurst is an electoral ward of Chichester District, West Sussex, England and returns two members to sit on Chichester District Council.

Following a district boundary review, the former ward of Stedham was split and merged into Midhurst in 2019.

Councillors

Election results

References

External links
 Chichester District Council
 Election Maps

Wards of Chichester District
Midhurst